The Mongolian University of Life Sciences (lit. University of Agriculture) is a national university of Mongolia, with the main branch situated in the capital of Ulaanbaatar. It lies in the southern part of the city in the Khoroo 11 district  on the southern side of the Tuul River, just to the northwest of the Zaisan Memorial and the American School of Ulan Bator.

It was formerly the veterinary faculty of the Mongolian State University and Higher School of Agriculture from 1958 but underwent structural reform in 1990 and 1993, with seven schools,  four research institutes and three university branches in Orkhon Province, Dornod Province and Khovd Province since 2001. 7060 undergraduates and 1045 graduates were reported in 2008.

References

External links
Mongolian University of Life Sciences - Official site
WEB Archive of Official site
Address in Google Maps

Universities in Mongolia
Buildings and structures in Ulaanbaatar
Agricultural universities and colleges